The Martin T4M was an American torpedo bomber of the 1920s.  A development by the Glenn L. Martin Company of their earlier Martin T3M, and, like it a single-engined biplane, the T4M served as the standard torpedo bomber aboard the aircraft carriers of the United States Navy through much of the 1930s.

Development and design
The Martin Model 74 was designed and developed by the Glenn L. Martin Company as a result of testing of the experimental radial-engined developments of the Martin T3M, the XT3M-3 and XT3M-4. The resulting prototype, designated XT4M-1, first flew in April 1927, and was purchased by the U.S. Navy for further evaluation.

The XT4M-1 had new single-bay fabric-covered metal wings of shorter span than the wooden wings of the T3M. It was powered by a Pratt & Whitney Hornet, (as used by the XT3M-3), and was fitted with a revised rudder. The fuselage was similar to that of the T3M-2, and like the earlier aircraft, could be fitted with either a wheeled undercarriage or floats.

As a result of the successful trials, the U.S. Navy ordered 102 similar production aircraft from Martin as the T4M-1 on June 30, 1927. Martin sold their Cleveland factory, which had built the T4M, to the Great Lakes Aircraft Company in October 1928, which resulted in Great Lakes receiving an order for 18 aircraft with slightly modified undercarriages as the TG-1. On 2 July 1930, the U.S. Navy placed an order for 32 aircraft, powered by a more powerful Wright Cyclone radial engines with the Detroit Aircraft Corporation, as the TE-1. Detroit, however, passed the order to Great Lakes, which by this time was a subsidiary, and the aircraft were built as TG-2s.

Operational history

Deliveries continued until 1931.

While its predecessor, the T3M, spent much of its time operating from floats, by the time the T4M and TG entered service, the U.S. Navy had realised the greater versatility of the aircraft carrier, and the T4Ms and TGs were mainly operated with wheeled undercarriages from the decks of carriers. The capability of carrier-based air power was demonstrated in fleet exercises in January 1929, when aircraft from Saratoga, including T4Ms, carried out mock attacks on the Panama Canal. Despite a defending force including Lexington and shore-based Navy and Army aircraft, the strike force was judged to have "destroyed" the canal locks as well as airfields. The exercise was described as "the most brilliantly conceived and most effectively executed naval operation in our history" by Admiral William V Pratt, who later became Commander-in-Chief of the U.S. Fleet.

The T4M was unusual in that its slab-sided fuselage was large enough to allow flight crews to get up and move around between positions. It was so spacious that a man could nearly stand up within it. Of its flying qualities, one pilot was quoted as saying "It takes off, cruises, and lands at 65 knots".

The T4M and TG proved difficult to replace, with both the XT6M and XT3D being evaluated but failing to demonstrate sufficient improvement to justify purchase. They remained in service until 1938, being eventually replaced by the TBD Devastator and becoming the last biplane torpedo bomber of the U.S. Navy.

Variants

XT4M-1
Prototype. Powered by 525 hp (392 kW) Pratt & Whitney R-1690-24 engine. One built.
T4M-1
Initial production version by Martin, powered by R-1690-24 engine. 102 built.
TG-1
Version with slightly modified undercarriage, powered by 525 hp (392 kW) Pratt & Whitney R-1690-28 engine. 18 built by Great Lakes.
TG-1 Commercial
Civil version of TG-1. Two built.
TG-2
Version powered by 620 hp (463 kW) Wright R-1820-86 Cyclone. 32 built by Great Lakes (originally ordered as TE-1).

Operators

United States Marines Corps
United States Navy

Specifications (T4M-1)

See also

References
Citations

Bibliography

Angelucci, Enzo (ed.). World Encyclopedia of Military Aircraft. London: Jane's, 1981. .
 Donald, David (editor). The Encyclopedia of World Aircraft. Aerospace Publishing. 1997. .
 Grossnik, Roy A. Dictionary of American Naval Aviation Squadrons: Volume 1 The History of VA, VAH, VAK, VAL, VAP and VFA Squadrons. Washington DC: Naval Historical Centre, 1995. .
 Johnson, Edward C. Marine Corps Aviation: The Early Years 1912-1940. Washington DC: U.S. Marine Corps, 1977.
 Johnson, E.R. "United States Naval Aviation, 1919-1941: Aircraft, Airships and Ships Between the Wars" McFarland. 2014. 
 Melton USNR, Lt. Comdr. Dick. the Forty Year Hitch. Wyandotte, Michigan: Publishers Consulting Services, 1970
 Polmar, Norman. Historic Naval Aircraft: From the Pages of Naval History Magazine. Washington, D.C. : Brassey's, 2004. .
 Swanborough, Gordon and Bowers, Peter M. United States Navy Aircraft since 1911. London:Putnam, Second edition 1976. .
 Taylor, M.J.H. Warplanes of the World: 1918-1939. Shepperton, Surrey, UK: Ian Allan, 1981. .

External links

Aerofiles, Martin
Maryland Aviation Museum
Naval Air Station Grosse Point Ile Virtual Museum.

Martin T04M
T4M
Single-engined tractor aircraft
Carrier-based aircraft
Biplanes